Unplugged is an acoustic live album by Canadian musician Bryan Adams. The album was recorded completely on September 26, 1997, at the Hammerstein Ballroom in New York City. Recorded by David Hewitt and Bob Clearmountain on the Remote Recording Silver Truck. Adams was joined by Irish piper Davy Spillane and Michael Kamen who wrote orchestrations for many of the songs and brought students from the Juilliard School to play them. Three new songs were included; "Back To You", "When You Love Someone", and "A Little Love". The song "If Ya Wanna Be Bad - Ya Gotta Be Good" makes its debut on an album, originally appearing on the B-side of "Let's Make a Night to Remember" - to which it is paired on the Unplugged album. Absent from both the CD and DVD is "Hey Elvis", which is available on the single of "Back To You". A second single was released in early 1998, an acoustic reworking of the hard rock song, "I'm Ready".

The album included only thirteen of the songs recorded at the show. The MTV Unplugged DVD included a few different songs and the song order is also different from on the CD.

The record sold over 2,500,000 units worldwide.

CD track listing

Personnel 
Credits adapted from the album's liner notes.

Musicians
 Bryan Adams – lead vocals, guitar, dobro, harmonica
 Patrick Leonard – acoustic piano, organ
 Tommy Mandel – acoustic piano, organ, accordion
 Keith Scott – guitar, mandolin, dobro, slide guitar, harmony vocals 
 Dave Taylor – bass, harmony vocals 
 Mickey Curry – drums, harmony vocals 
 Danny Cummings – percussion, harmony vocals 
 Davy Spillane – Uilleann pipes, low whistles

Strings
 Michael Kamen – arrangements and conductor 
 Tom Nazelli, Douglas Quint and Scott Starrett – additional arrangements 
 Jesse Levy – coordinator 
 Students of the Juilliard School of Music:
 Darrett Adkins, Maria Ahn, Raphael Bell and Nina Lee – cello 
 Pete Donovan – double bass 
 Ed Malave, Tania Halko and Alejandra Mahave – viola 
 Angella Ahn, Cornelius Dufallo, Ani Gregorian, Ara Gregorian, Lyris Hung, Amy Kauffman, Jennifer Newell and James Tsao – violin

Production 
 Bryan Adams – producer, arrangements 
 Patrick Leonard – producer, arrangements 
 Bob Clearmountain – engineer, mixing 
 Dave Hewitt – engineer 
 Phil Gitomer – assistant engineer
 Dean Maher – mix assistant 
 Chris Potter – mix assistant 
 Olle Romo – mix assistant 
 Phil Western – mix assistant 
 Glen Collette – monitor mixing
 Joey Perpick – live sound mix engineer 
 Ron Vermeulen – technical assistant 
 Bob Ludwig – mastering at Gateway Mastering (Portland, Maine)
 Val Dauksts – production manager 
 Don "Toe" Prodaehl – tour manager 
 Tom O'Quinn – art direction, design 
 Glen Ross – art direction, design
 Sandy Brummels – art direction, design
 Danny Clinch – photography 
 Bruce Allen – management 
 Chris Chappel – tour management

Technicians
 Dennis Fitzmartin (keyboards)
 Lance Stadnyk (Bryan Adams' guitars)
 Rick Salazar (Keith Scott's guitars)
 Lorne Wheaton (drums)

MTV Credits
 Milton Lage – director 
 Alex Coletti – producer 
 Jac Benson – co-producer

Charts

Weekly charts

Year-end charts

Certifications

Album

DVD

References 

1997 live albums
1997 video albums
Live video albums
Bryan Adams albums
MTV Unplugged albums
Albums produced by Patrick Leonard
Albums recorded at the Hammerstein Ballroom